York Publishing Services is a full range publisher based in the north of England. They provide services for being self publishers and established publishers.

History
York Publishing Services provides a complete range of publishing services for both self publishers and established publishers. They provide all the services to develop books and publications from manuscript, through all the stages of production, to printing and distribution.

YPD Books
Alongside the main publishing arm, York Publishing Services operates YPD Books, a distribution company aimed toward "independently published authors, books that are hard to find on the high street and difficult to order on Amazon."

References

External links
 
 ypdbooks

Book publishing companies of the United Kingdom
Publishing companies established in 1993